The Dominican Summer League Athletics or DSL Athletics are a Minor League Baseball team of the Dominican Summer League that began play in 1989 as a rookie-level affiliate of the Oakland Athletics. They are located in Boca Chica, Santo Domingo, Dominican Republic, and play their home games at the Juan Marichal Complex. Two DSL Athletics squads existed between 1997 and 2008—DSL Athletics East and West (1997–2002) and DSL Athletics 1 and 2 (2003–08).

Roster

References

External links
Dominican Summer League Athletics page at MiLB.com

Baseball teams established in 1989
Dominican Summer League teams
Baseball teams in the Dominican Republic
Oakland Athletics minor league affiliates
1989 establishments in the Dominican Republic